Marolles-en-Beauce (literally Marolles in Beauce) is a commune in the Essonne department in Île-de-France in northern France. It is 55 kilometres from the southwest end of Paris.

Inhabitants of Marolles-en-Beauce are known as Marollais.

See also
Communes of the Essonne department

References

External links

Mayors of Essonne Association 

Communes of Essonne